Lakeisha or LaKeisha is a given name. Notable people with the given name include:

LaKeisha Lawson (born 1987), American sprinter
Lakeisha Patterson (born 1999), Australian Paralympic swimmer

See also
Lakisha

African-American given names